Huangdian is a town in  Dingtao County in southwestern Shandong province, China, located  due east of the county seat. , it has 50 villages under its administration.

See also 
 List of township-level divisions of Shandong

References 

Township-level divisions of Shandong